Madoc  is a community in the municipality of Centre Hastings, Hastings County, Ontario, Canada. It is located at the junction of Highway 7 and Highway 62, southeast of Bancroft, halfway between Toronto and Ottawa.

History
Madoc was originally named MacKenzie's Mills after Donald MacKenzie, who built a sawmill and grist mill here. It was briefly named Hastings but renamed Madoc Township after the legendary Welsh prince Madoc ap Owain Gwynedd, credited by some with discovering North America in 1170. When people traveled by horse and carriage during the 19th century from Toronto to Ottawa, Madoc was the halfway stop over, allowing the passengers and horses to rest.  The community separated from the namesake township and remained an incorporated municipality until 1998.

The area has had a rich mining history. Gold was discovered at nearby Eldorado in 1866. Fluorite was extracted from the area during the 1930s and 1940s. The talc mine, under the name Canada Talc (Cantalc), that was in production in Madoc for almost 114 years by 2010 is now shutting down. It is one of only three mines in the world that has been in steady operation for more than one hundred years.

On January 25, 1998, the Village of Madoc amalgamated with Huntingdon Township to form Centre Hastings. Madoc is the largest community in the municipality. Its post office services locals with lock boxes and rural routes.

In 2008, Madoc celebrated its 130th anniversary.

Attractions
O'Hara Mill Homestead and Conservation Area features the O'Hara Sawmill.  It is reputedly the only water-powered upright frame saw left in Ontario.  It has been restored to operating condition by volunteers and is a centre piece of the revitalized homestead and conservation area.  Being near the junction of highways 7 and 62, it offers an intriguing rest stop to travellers.

The village has a premier skateboard park with splash pad, canteen, night-time lighting with bleachers and performing arts centre with music stage made from straw-bale construction.

An outdoor public swimming pool is located at 65 Queen Victoria St. W. in Madoc. It is run through the Municipality of Centre Hastings.

A public boat launch at Moira Lake South of the town offers a boat launch, swimming and a beachfront. As of 2013 a boat launch revitalization project has started, led by Madoc Kiwanis Club and will feature a new boat launch, boat ramp and docking area and marshland boardwalk, safe swimming area and more parking.

The Tim Hortons restaurant in Madoc pours more than 3,000 cups of coffee a day, making it one of the busiest within the chain.

The Tri-Lakes Medical Centre opened in Madoc in June 2009.

Notable people
People born here include:
Allan Roy Dafoe, delivered and cared for the Dionne Quintuplets.
Colin Scott Dafoe, surgeon with Marshall Josip Broz Tito's Partisans in Yugoslavia during the Second World War.
Theresa Bailey, creator of www.canadianhockeymoms.ca.
John Weir Foote, awarded the Victoria Cross.

References

Communities in Hastings County
Former villages in Ontario
Populated places disestablished in 1998